Latin-script German words are transcribed into Cyrillic-script languages according to rules based on pronunciation. Because German orthography is largely phonemic, transcription into Cyrillic follows relatively simple rules.

Russian and Bulgarian

The standard rules for orthographic transcription into Russian were developed by Rudzhero S. Giliarevski (ru) and Boris A. Starostin (ru) in 1969 for various languages; they have been revised by later scholars including D. I. Ermolovich (ru) and I. S. Alexeyeva (ru). The established spellings of a few names which were already common before this time sometimes deviates from these rules; for example, the Ludwig is traditionally Людвиг (including in placenames), with ю instead of у. It was also historically common to render personal names into their Russian forms or cognates, rather than strictly transliterating them, as with Peter being rendered as Пётр. German phonemes which do not exist in Russian are rendered by their closest approximations: the umlauts ö and ü are rendered as ё (yo) and ю (yu), and ä and e are mostly rendered as е (not э). H (when not part of a cluster) is now rendered with х or omitted (when silent); it was historically often rendered with г (g), as in the name of Heinrich Heine (Russian: Генрих Гейне). The Cyrillic letters ы and щ are not used.

Sample texts

Universal Declaration of Human Rights, Article 1

References

Further reading
 Ermolovich, D. I. (ru), Имена собственные на стыке языков и культур (link, 2010-12-07 archive, pages 1-133) (Moscow, Р. Валент publishing house, 2001), Таблицы практической транскрипции (транслитерации) с основных европейских языков, пользующихся латиницей, на русский: Немецкий язык (Tables of practical transcription (transliteration) from the main European languages, using the Latin alphabet: German language), pages 156-158.
 Alexeyeva, I. S. (ru), Введение в переводоведение: учеб. пособие для студ. филол. и лингв. фак. высш. учеб. заведений. 6th edition (Philological Faculty of St. Petersburg State University; Moscow Publishing Center "Academy"; 2012), Table 2, German-Russian Phonemic Conformity, pages 228-230 (pdf pages 114-115)
 Инструкция по русской передаче немецких географических названий (В. С. Широкова; ed. Г. П. Бондарук) (Moscow, Типография издательства «Известия», 1974)

German
German language